Robi Reed (born Robin Lynn Reed) is an American casting director and producer. She has over 50 films and television shows to her credit, including The Best Man, Soul Food, For Colored Girls, Love Jones, Set It Off, In Living Color and Girlfriends. She began her career working with the writer-director Spike Lee. His 1988 release, School Daze, was her first film as a casting director. She went on to cast Lee's Malcolm X, Do the Right Thing, Mo' Better Blues, Crooklyn, Clockers and Jungle Fever.

Reed is currently the vice president of talent and casting for original programming at Black Entertainment Television (BET), where she oversees talent and casting for scripted and non-scripted shows.

Career 
Reed has had a hand in the careers of many top Hollywood stars and has worked to open doors for African-American actors for over 20 years. She has cast Jamie Foxx, Denzel Washington, Jada Pinkett Smith, Queen Latifah and others in major roles.

She is credited with jumpstarting Halle Berry's film career in 1991 by offering her a role alongside Samuel L. Jackson in Lee's Jungle Fever. She also cast Derek Luke to star in his first leading role in the 2002 film Antwone Fisher.

In 1997, Reed earned an Emmy Award for Outstanding Casting in a Drama for her work on The Tuskegee Airmen (HBO). She received a second Emmy nomination in 1998 for her work in casting HBO's Don King: Only in America and a third nomination in 1999 for HBO’'s A Lesson Before Dying.

Reed is the first African-American to be nominated and win an Emmy for casting.

Early life 
Reed was born in Mount Vernon, New York, but grew up in Los Angeles where she was exposed to Hollywood at a young age. By the age of 15, she knew she wanted to do casting after accompanying her younger brother, a child actor, to auditions.

Reed was fascinated with film and TV and always read the cast and crew credits from beginning to end. She was determined to know every actor, actress, producer, director and casting agent in Hollywood. She made it her business to learn everything there was to know about the film and TV industry by quizzing herself using index cards to test her knowledge and ability to recall names, parts and projects.

That determination landed Reed her first job as an assistant production office coordinator on the film, The Falcon and the Snowman, starring Sean Penn and Timothy Hutton.

Education 
Reed earned a Bachelor of Science degree in speech communication and theatre from Hampton University. She is also a member of Delta Sigma Theta sorority.

Personal 
Reed is the mother of two children, a son named Noah and a daughter Summer.

In 2012, she launched the Reed for Hope Foundation, a nonprofit organization that aims to build alliances with other charities and organizations in the fight against the spread of HIV/AIDS and other life-threatening diseases.

Each year, Reed hosts her annual Sunshine Beyond Summer Celebration where she brings together close friends, associates and peers to have a good time in the spirit of serving the community. It is held every year at the private residence of a selected supporting benefactor, which has included the homes of Jamie Foxx, the former Los Angeles mayor, Antonio Villaraigosa, and Judge Greg Mathis. The event started in 2002 as an intimate gathering of friends coming together for Reed's annual end-of-summer barbecue. Today, the event has grown beyond those humble beginnings into a much-anticipated summer event. The Black AIDS Institute had been the charitable beneficiary of Reed's event since its inception and, now, all proceeds benefit the Reed for Hope Foundation.

Filmography

Films

Television series and mini-series

Television movies

Awards and nominations

Additional awards
Trumpet Award
1993 - Won for Casting (Heat Wave)
NAMIC Vision Awards
 2007 - Won Legacy Award
Bronze Lens Award
 2010 - Honored as Legendary 'Behind the Scenes' Superstar
Black Reel Awards
 2011 - Won for Best Ensemble (For Colored Girls)

References

External links 
Reed for Hope Foundation
Sunshine Beyond Summer Celebration
 

Living people
Emmy Award winners
Year of birth missing (living people)